Zagora–Mouresi is a municipality in the Magnesia regional unit, Thessaly, Greece. The seat of the municipality is the town Zagora. The municipality has an area of 150.315 km2.

Municipality
The municipality Zagora–Mouresi was formed at the 2011 local government reform by the merger of the following 2 former municipalities, that became municipal units:
Mouresi
Zagora

References

Municipalities of Thessaly
Pelion